An outdoor sculpture of Roscoe Conkling by John Quincy Adams Ward is installed near Madison Avenue and 23rd Street in Madison Square Park in Manhattan, New York.

See also
 1893 in art

References

External links
 

1893 establishments in New York (state)
1893 sculptures
Bronze sculptures in Manhattan
Monuments and memorials in Manhattan
Outdoor sculptures in Manhattan
Sculptures of men in New York City
Statues in New York City
Flatiron District